Petit-Mesnil is a commune in the Aube department in north-central France.

Surrounded by the municipalities of La Rothiere, Chaumesnil and Éclance, Petit-Mesnil is located 38 km northeast of Troyes, the largest nearby city.

Population

See also
Communes of the Aube department

References

Communes of Aube
Aube communes articles needing translation from French Wikipedia